The Lewisburg Hall and Warehouse Company Building is a building located in Lewisburg, Oregon listed on the National Register of Historic Places.

See also
 National Register of Historic Places listings in Benton County, Oregon

References

External links
 Oregon Inventory of Historic Properties Form

1911 establishments in Oregon
Buildings and structures completed in 1911
National Register of Historic Places in Benton County, Oregon